The 1960 presidential campaign of John F. Kennedy, then junior United States senator from Massachusetts, was formally launched on January 2, 1960, as Senator Kennedy announced his intention to seek the Democratic Party nomination for the presidency of the United States in the 1960 presidential election.

Kennedy was nominated by the Democratic Party at the national convention on July 15, 1960 and he named Senator Lyndon B. Johnson as his vice presidential running mate. On November 8, 1960 they defeated incumbent Vice President Richard Nixon and United Nations Ambassador Henry Cabot Lodge Jr. in the general election. Kennedy was sworn in as president on January 20, 1961 and would serve until his assassination on November 22, 1963. His brothers Robert and Ted would both later run for president in 1968 and 1980, but neither received the presidential nomination.

Background

During the 1956 presidential election Kennedy was speculated as a possible vice presidential nominee. Before the vice presidential nomination ballot multiple Massachusetts politicians, including former Governor Paul A. Dever, gave their support to Kennedy and pushed for other state delegations to support him. On the first ballot, Kennedy came in second place to Senator Estes Kefauver, but came ahead of him on the second ballot due to support from Mayor Robert F. Wagner Jr., another Catholic, and Southerners who opposed Kefauver's anti-segregation beliefs. However, on the third ballot Kefauver won with the support of Senator Albert Gore Sr., but would lose in the general election alongside Adlai Stevenson II. Kennedy later stated that had he won the vice presidential nomination his political career would have ended due to the Republican landslide in the general election.

On October 24, 1958, Frank Sinatra came out in support of a possible Kennedy presidential campaign and on June 16, 1959, Governor John Malcolm Patterson stated that he would work towards Kennedy receiving the Democratic presidential nomination.

On December 17, 1959, a letter from Kennedy's staff that was to be sent to "active and influential Democrats" was leaked stating that he would announce his presidential campaign on January 2, 1960. On December 30, 1959, Senator Hubert Humphrey announced his presidential campaign and stated that he would not participate in the New Hampshire primary.

Announcement

On January 2, 1960, Kennedy formally announced that he would seek the Democratic presidential nomination in Washington, D.C. and stated that he would participate in multiple primaries, including New Hampshire. He also stated that he would not accept the vice presidential nomination and would rather stay in the Senate if he lost the presidential nomination.

Campaign

January

On January 5, 1960, Governor Michael DiSalle, who was initially running as a favorite son candidate to lead Ohio's delegation at the national convention, endorsed Kennedy and stated that he would lead the Ohio delegation in support of him. On January 8, Kennedy filed to run in the New Hampshire primary being the only major candidate to do so along with minor candidate Paul C. Fisher.

On January 10, Jimmy Hoffa, President of the International Brotherhood of Teamsters, criticized Kennedy for his amendment on the Landrum–Griffin Act and that he was a fraud that ignoring the labor unions. Senator Wayne Morse also criticized Kennedy for his support of the bill and stated that it was one of the main reasons he was opposing Kennedy in the primary. However, David J. McDonald, the president of the United Steelworkers of America, stated that Joseph P. Kennedy Sr. aided the labor unions during the Steel strike of 1959 and George Meany, the president of the AFL–CIO, praised Kennedy for his amendment.

On January 12, Governor Happy Chandler stated that Kennedy would lose multiple Southern states due to his religion including Kentucky.

March

Kennedy won the New Hampshire primary on March 8 without facing any opposition. After the results came in, Kennedy expressed enthusiasm while in Madison: "I'm very happy about it; we did better than I thought we would."

The next primary was in Wisconsin. The year prior to the primaries, in June 1959, Kennedy met Jerry Bruno, who had organized the campaign of William Proxmire for the U.S. Senate, Kennedy making the request for the latter to open a campaign headquarters for him in Milwaukee. On January 21, 1960, Kennedy announced his intent to compete in Wisconsin. Days before the primary, Kennedy said it had been the "toughest, closest, most meaningful".

Humphrey's entry into the Wisconsin primary gave the Kennedy campaign the two objectives of decisively defeating him in most parts of the state to end his candidacy altogether and portray Kennedy's national appeal at capturing votes. In the West Virginia primary, one of the goals the Kennedy campaign had was to financially weaken Humphrey's campaign, alongside the use of attack ads against him.

November

On November 1, Kennedy started a seventeen state campaign drive to visit California, Arizona, New Mexico, Texas, Oklahoma, Virginia, Ohio, Michigan, Illinois, New York, Connecticut, New Jersey, Vermont, New Hampshire, Rhode Island, Maine, and Massachusetts while Nixon was focused on completing his promise to campaign in all fifty states that he made at the Republican National Convention. Larry Sabato and other political commentators would later criticize Nixon's decision to campaign in all fifty states as one of the reasons for his defeat as it prevented him from focusing on important swing states.

Allan Shivers, the former Democratic Governor of Texas who supported Eisenhower in the 1952 and 1956 presidential elections, criticized Kennedy for accepting the endorsement of the Liberal Party of New York, that the Democratic platform was more restrictive on farmers than communist countries, and that Nixon would win Texas due to his leadership experience at an event sponsored by the Democrats for Nixon.

On November 8, he and Johnson defeated Nixon and Lodge with 303 electoral votes and 34,220,984 votes ahead of Nixon's 219 electoral votes and 34,108,157 votes. However, due to the way Alabama conducted its presidential election the popular vote winner was left in contention and there were accusations of election illegalities in Illinois and Texas due to Kennedy's narrow victories with 8,858 and 46,266 votes respectively. Kennedy was initially projected to win California by 37,000 votes, but after absentee ballots were counted Nixon won the state by 35,623 votes. Nixon was also projected to win Hawaii, but a recount was conducted and Kennedy narrowly won by 115 votes.

Controversies

Hawaii

On November 8, the final unofficial vote total showed Kennedy winning Hawaii by 102 votes with 92,193 votes against Nixon's 92,091 votes. However, Nixon was declared the winner after more absentee ballots came in increasing his margin to 141 on November 17. On December 2, a recount of 37 precincts was ordered by Circuit Court Judge Ronald B. Jamieson and later ordered more precincts to be recounted. On December 16, Kennedy overtook Nixon in the popular vote and on December 27, Jamieson ruled that Kennedy had won by 115 votes.

However, Governor William F. Quinn had signed the certificate giving Hawaii's three electoral votes to the Republicans, but he later signed another certificate after the recount showed Kennedy winning. When Congress convened on January 3, 1961, Nixon, as president of the Senate had to preside over a joint session to certify the presidential election, certified Kennedy as the winner of Hawaii's electoral votes.

Endorsements

See also
Robert F. Kennedy 1968 presidential campaign
Ted Kennedy 1980 presidential campaign

References

External links

John F. Kennedy
Lyndon B. Johnson
Kennedy, John F.
Kennedy, John F.